Statistics of Swiss Super League in the 1938–39 season.

Overview
It was contested by 12 teams, and Grasshopper Club Zürich won the championship.

League standings

Results

Sources 
 Switzerland 1938-39 at RSSSF

Nationalliga seasons
Swiss
Swiss Football, 1938-39 In